Samuel S. Yasgur (January 9, 1942 – June 23, 2016) was an American attorney and Sullivan County, New York official. He was the son of Max Yasgur, who leased land on his  dairy farm in Bethel, New York for the Woodstock Music & Art Festival in August 1969. 
Yasgur said that his "consultations with his father" played a crucial role in the concert coming to Bethel. He grew up on his father's farm, and was a graduate of Cornell University and the University of Chicago Law School.

Yasgur was a 27-year-old assistant district attorney in Manhattan when his father allowed the Woodstock Festival to take place on his land. The concert had just been barred from taking place at the Orange County town of Wallkill, NY. The Woodstock Festival took place from August 15 to 18, 1969.

Yasgur went on to become an attorney at Hall Dickler, and also served as Westchester County Attorney.

Yasgur wrote a book about his father, Max B. Yasgur: The Woodstock Festival’s Famous Farmer, which was self-published in August 2009.

Yasgur died in 2016 from bone cancer.

References

External links
Sullivan County Democrat: Those Who Shaped History
Sam Yasgur website

1942 births
2016 deaths
American prosecutors
Cornell University alumni
New York (state) lawyers
People from Bethel, New York
People from Mamaroneck, New York
People from Monticello, New York
People from the Catskills
University of Chicago Law School alumni
American people of Russian-Jewish descent
20th-century American lawyers
Deaths from cancer in New York (state)